Falkirk Burghs  was a district of burghs constituency of the House of Commons of the Parliament of the United Kingdom from 1832 to 1918. The constituency comprised the burghs of Falkirk, Airdrie, Hamilton, Lanark and Linlithgow, lying in Stirlingshire, Lanarkshire and Linlithgowshire.

In 1918, Falkirk became part of Stirling and Falkirk Burghs, Hamilton and Lanark formed the core of new Hamilton and Lanark constituencies, and Linlithgow was represented as part of Linlithgowshire.

Members of Parliament

Elections

Elections in the 1830s

Elections in the 1840s

Baird resigned by accepting the office of Steward of the Chiltern Hundreds, causing a by-election.

Elections in the 1850s
Pelham-Clinton succeeded to the peerage, becoming 5th Duke of Newcastle and causing a by-election.

Merry's election was declared void on petition due to bribery by "injudicious partisans", causing a by-election.

Elections in the 1860s

Elections in the 1870s

Ramsay was disqualified from office, due to his holding of a Government contract at the time of the election. He stood again unopposed at a by-election.

Elections in the 1880s

The Hamilton Liberal Association nominated Roskill in protest against Ramsay. However, arbitration later led to their support for Ramsay and Roskill's withdrawal from the race. Weir did not agree to take part in the arbitration.

Elections in the 1890s

Elections in the 1900s

Elections in the 1910s

General Election 1914–15:

Another General Election was required to take place before the end of 1915. The political parties had been making preparations for an election to take place and by the July 1914, the following candidates had been selected; 
Liberal: John Macdonald
Unionist: James Wilson
British Socialist Party:

Notes and references 

Historic parliamentary constituencies in Scotland (Westminster)
Constituencies of the Parliament of the United Kingdom established in 1832
Constituencies of the Parliament of the United Kingdom disestablished in 1918
Politics of Falkirk (council area)